Renaissance Academy Charter School, located in Phoenixville, Pennsylvania, United States is a K-12 charter school with 1100 students and 200 staff. It serves students from multiple school districts in kindergarten through 12th grade.

The average SAT score for the Class of 2013 was 528 in math, 513 in reading, and 489 in writing.

References

External links

Charter schools in Pennsylvania